The UK Rock & Metal Albums Chart is a record chart which ranks the best-selling rock and heavy metal albums in the United Kingdom. Compiled and published by the Official Charts Company, the data is based on each album's weekly physical sales, digital downloads and streams. In 1995, there were 21 albums that topped the 52 published charts. The first number-one album of the year was the Bon Jovi compilation Cross Road, which remained at number one following a reign at the end of the previous year. The final number-one album of the year was Queen's final studio album Made in Heaven, which spent the last seven weeks of the year at number one.

The most successful album on the UK Rock & Metal Albums Chart in 1995 was Bon Jovi's sixth studio album These Days, which spent nine consecutive weeks at number one between 1 July and 26 August. Queen's Made in Heaven spent the last seven weeks of 1995 at number one and was the best-selling rock album of the year, ranking fifth in the UK End of Year Albums Chart. Green Day's third studio album Dookie also spent seven weeks at number one in 1995, while the follow-up Insomniac gave the band another two atop the chart. The Offspring's third studio album Smash was number one for three weeks, while four more albums – It's Five O'Clock Somewhere by Slash's Snakepit, P.H.U.Q. by The Wildhearts, One Hot Minute by Red Hot Chili Peppers and Ballbreaker by AC/DC – each spent two weeks at number one on the chart in 1995.

Chart history

See also
1995 in British music
List of UK Rock & Metal Singles Chart number ones of 1995

References

External links
Official UK Rock & Metal Albums Chart Top 40 at the Official Charts Company
The Official UK Top 40 Rock Albums at BBC Radio 1

1995 in British music
UK Rock and Metal Albums
1995